Athée may refer to the following places in France:

Athée, a commune in the department of Côte-d'Or
Athée, a commune in the department of Mayenne
Athée-sur-Cher, a commune in the department of Indre-et-Loire